The Trap Grounds (aka Trap Grounds Town Green) is a nature reserve in north Oxford, Oxfordshire, England, owned by Oxford City Council.

Overview
The site is to the east of the railway line and the Burgess Field Nature Park, to the west of the Oxford Canal and Hayfield Road in North Oxford, south of Frenchay Road and the Waterways housing estate, and north of SS Philip and James' Church of England Primary School and Aristotle Lane. Further to the west is Port Meadow and the River Thames. Further to the north is a Site of Special Scientific Interest (SSSI), Hook Meadow and The Trap Grounds. Also close by are the separately organized Trap Ground Allotments. The original Trap Grounds were much more extensive, including Burgess Field, but the present site is now largely surrounded by built-up suburbs of Oxford.

The site consists of woodland, reed beds, ponds, some grass areas, and paths including a boardwalk. There is a single point of entry to the site immediately to the south of Frenchay Road Bridge on the canal. Wildlife on the site includes slow worms.

History
In 2002, there was a public inquiry about converting the Trap Grounds, which was owned by the city council of Oxford at the time, to a town green. This inquiry would have made the Trap grounds open and accessible for public use. In 2003, a court considered another bid for the Trap Grounds to become a town green, this time as a preamble for a bid to develop the land into housing units. Later during 2005–06, a case involving Oxfordshire County Council and Oxford City Council to decide the future of the Trap Grounds was decided in the House of Lords. In 2007, Catherine Robinson of The Friends of The Trap Grounds, was awarded the Campaign to Protect Rural England's top honour for protecting the Trap Grounds from development. In 2010, a new walkway was created on the site. In 2012, there was discussion on how much access there should be to the site.

The Friends of The Trap Grounds
The Friends of The Trap Grounds is a volunteer organization that helps to maintain the Trap Grounds.

Panoramic view

Image gallery

See also
 Burgess Field Nature Park
 Hook Meadow and The Trap Grounds
 Oxford Canal
 Port Meadow

References

External links

 The Friends of The Trap Grounds website
 Catherine Robinson – The Trap Grounds on YouTube

Year of establishment missing
Nature reserves in Oxfordshire
Parks and open spaces in Oxford